Robert Alexander Greacen (born September 15, 1947) is an American former professional basketball player.

He grew up in South New Jersey, where he played high school basketball for Merchantville High School and helped lead Merchantville to the NJSIAA Group II state championship in 1965.

In Greacen's three varsity seasons with Rutgers University, he scored 1,154 points.  As a sophomore in 1967 he teamed with fellow Rutgers Hall of Famers Bob Lloyd and Jim Valvano to lead the team to a 22–7 record and the first-ever post-season appearance in Rutgers' basketball history.  The Scarlet Knights finished third in the 1967 NIT.

A 6'7" forward, Greacen was drafted by the Milwaukee Bucks in the second round of the 1969 NBA draft and by the Miami Floridians in the 1969 ABA draft.

Greacen played two seasons (1969–1971) in the National Basketball Association as a member of the Milwaukee Bucks. He averaged 2.6 points per game in his career and was a member of the Bucks NBA championship team in 1971.

He later briefly played for the New York Nets of the American Basketball Association.

He was a history teacher at Parkland High School in Allentown, Pennsylvania, where he retired in 2009.

References

External links

1947 births
Living people
American men's basketball players
Basketball players from New Jersey
Miami Floridians draft picks
Milwaukee Bucks draft picks
Milwaukee Bucks players
New York Nets players
People from Merchantville, New Jersey
Rutgers Scarlet Knights men's basketball players
Small forwards
Sportspeople from Camden County, New Jersey